The Mercury Seven were the seven original American astronauts.

Mercury 7 may also refer to:

 Mercury 7, a spacecraft of Project Mercury
 Mercury VII, a version of the Bristol Mercury aircraft engine

See also
Mercury (disambiguation)
Mercury-Atlas 7, a 1962 space flight